The A.L.F.A 15 -20 HP is a car produced by A.L.F.A, manufacturer that later became Alfa Romeo.

History 

The model was derived from 15 HP and was fitted with a four-cylinder engine and 2,413 cc of displacement. Compared to its ancestor, the engine capacity was unchanged compared with a rise of power delivered. In fact the engine of 15-20 HP had a compression ratio of 4.3: 1 and developed a maximum power of 28 CV at 2,400 rpm. It was front engined rear wheel drive car. It had a gearbox with three gears.

The 15-20 HP was available in two types of body, torpedo and sedan.

It was designed by Giuseppe Merosi and it was on sale, at launch, to 9,500 lire. In 1920, after the end of World War I, the price was whipped up to 24,000 liras. The production was in fact interrupted between 1915 and 1919 for the war. It went out of production in 1920. It was not until 1923, when the  Alfa launched similar car, the RM.

Notes

Bibliography 
 
 

15-20 HP
Brass Era vehicles
Cars introduced in 1914
1920s cars